Calpine is a census-designated place in Sierra County, California, United States. The 2010 United States census reported Calpine's population was 205.

Geography
According to the United States Census Bureau, the CDP covers an area of 0.7 square miles (1.8 km2), 99.69% of it land and 0.31% of it water.

History
The town was founded to support the Davies-Johnson Lumber Mill around 1919.  From 1921 until 1940, a branch of the Western Pacific Railroad served the town and the mill, working out of Portola, California.  The timber stocks were gone by 1939 and the mill closed soon after.

The name could be an abbreviation of the surname McAlpine.

Demographics

The 2010 United States Census reported that Calpine had a population of 205. The racial makeup of Calpine was 184 (89.8%) White, 0 (0.0%) African American, 0 (0.0%) Native American, 0 (0.0%) Asian, 1 (0.5%) Pacific Islander, 10 (4.9%) from other races, and 10 (4.9%) from two or more races. Hispanic or Latino of any race were 26 persons (12.7%).

The Census reported that 205 people (100% of the population) lived in households, 0 (0%) lived in non-institutionalized group quarters, and 0 (0%) were institutionalized.

There were 96 households, out of which 17 (17.7%) had children under the age of 18 living in them, 44 (45.8%) were opposite-sex married couples living together, 8 (8.3%) had a female householder with no husband present, 3 (3.1%) had a male householder with no wife present.  There were 10 (10.4%) unmarried opposite-sex partnerships, and 2 (2.1%) same-sex married couples or partnerships. 34 households (35.4%) were made up of individuals, and 12 (12.5%) had someone living alone who was 65 years of age or older. The average household size was 2.14.  There were 55 families (57.3% of all households); the average family size was 2.73.

The population was spread out, with 37 people (18.0%) under the age of 18, 10 people (4.9%) aged 18 to 24, 37 people (18.0%) aged 25 to 44, 92 people (44.9%) aged 45 to 64, and 29 people (14.1%) who were 65 years of age or older.  The median age was 49.8 years. For every 100 females, there were 97.1 males.  For every 100 females age 18 and over, there were 112.7 males.

The homeowner vacancy rate was 3.8%; the rental vacancy rate was 15.4%.  161 people (78.5% of the population) lived in owner-occupied housing units and 44 people (21.5%) lived in rental housing units.

Politics

References

Census-designated places in Sierra County, California
Populated places in the Sierra Nevada (United States)